Viktor Mikhaylovich Zimin (: 23 August 1962 – 23 November 2020) was a Russian politician.

Biography
He served as Chairman of the Government of the Republic of Khakassia, a federal subject of Russia, from 2009 until 2018. He came into power after Aleksey Lebed left office. His father was Russian, his mother was of German descent.

In 2018, Zimin lost his bid for re-election to a third term in the first round of voting and declined to participate in the second, amid low polling.

He died in Moscow on 23 November 2020, after contracting COVID-19.

References

External links
Official website  
Biography  

1962 births
2020 deaths
People from Krasnoyarsk Krai
Heads of the federal subjects of Russia of German descent
United Russia politicians
Fifth convocation members of the State Duma (Russian Federation)
Heads of the Republic of Khakassia
Deaths from the COVID-19 pandemic in Russia